Niet is a punk rock and hardcore punk band from Ljubljana, Slovenia. They were one of the most iconic and influential music groups of the Slovenian punk movement and the punk rock in Yugoslavia in general. The band was active from 1983 to 1988, from 1993 to 1994 and 2008 to 2017  and is active again since December 2019.

Band members
First era  (1983–1988)

 Primož Habič - vocals (1983–1988)
 Igor Dernovšek - guitar (1983–1988)
 Aleš Češnovar - bass (1983–1988)
 Tomaž Dimnik - drums (1983–1985)
 Tanja Ukmar - female vocals (1984–1985)
 Tomaž Bergant - drums (1985–1988)
 Robert Likar - guitar (1985–1988)

Second era  (1993–1994)

 Igor Dernovšek - guitar, vocals (1993–1994)
 Šani Kolbezen - guitar (1993–1994)
 Tadej Vobovnik - bass (1993–1994)
 Slavc Colnarič - drums (1993–1994)

The return (2008–2017)

 Borut Marolt - vocals
 Igor Dernovšek - guitar
 Aleš Češnovar - bass (2008-2010)
 Janez Brezigar - bass (2010-2017)
 Robert Likar - guitar
 Tomaž Bergant - drums

Discography
 Srečna mladina (1984, FV založba)
 Niet (1993, Kif Kif)
 Live (1995, Vinilmanija)
 Lep dan za smrt (1996, Vinilmanija)
 Bil je maj (2008, Menart Records)
 Izštekani na Valu 202 (2008, ZKP RTVS)
 Trinajst (2010, ZKP RTVS)
 Rokovnjači (2012, ZKP RTVS)

See also

SFR Yugoslav pop and rock scene
New wave music in Yugoslavia
 https://web.archive.org/web/20131203003007/http://www.niet.si/
Niet Official (Facebook)

References

Yugoslav punk rock groups
Musical groups established in 1983
Slovenian rock music groups
Slovenian punk rock groups
Musical groups reestablished in 2008
Musical groups from Ljubljana
Musical groups disestablished in 2017